Dragan Mladenović (Serbian Cyrillic: Драган Младеновић; born 16 February 1976) is a retired Serbian professional footballer.

Career
Mladenović joined Rangers from Serbian champions Red Star Belgrade for £1.1m in August 2004. He made his Rangers debut against Hibernian on 21 August 2004. However, he failed to settle at Ibrox and was subsequently loaned out to Real Sociedad in January 2005. He was released by Rangers on August 30, despite having three years left on his contract, and re-joined Red Star Belgrade on a free transfer. This time he wasn't so successful.  In 2006, Mladenović joined South Korean side Incheon United, where he continued playing until the 2009/10 season, after which he retired from professional football. Today he lives in Belgrade, Serbia, and currently is director of Red Star Belgrade youth academy.

International career
Mladenović played 17 games for his country. He scored his only international goal in his country's 1–0 win against Wales on 20 August 2003.

References

External links
 
 
 

1976 births
Living people
Sportspeople from Kraljevo
Serbian footballers
Association football midfielders
Serbia and Montenegro international footballers
FK Sloga Kraljevo players
FK Zemun players
Red Star Belgrade footballers
Rangers F.C. players
Real Sociedad footballers
Incheon United FC players
Scottish Premier League players
La Liga players
K League 1 players
Serbian expatriate footballers
Expatriate footballers in Scotland
Expatriate footballers in Spain
Expatriate footballers in South Korea
Serbian expatriate sportspeople in South Korea
Serbia and Montenegro expatriate footballers
Serbia and Montenegro footballers
Serbia and Montenegro expatriate sportspeople in Scotland
Serbia and Montenegro expatriate sportspeople in Spain